Gerson Alexis Barreto Gamboa (born 18 August 1995) is a Peruvian professional footballer who plays as a midfielder for Primera División club Universitario.

Career
Born in Lima, Barreto played youth football for Universitario before making his senior debut in 2013.

Having played for Universitario and Academia Deportiva Cantolao, Barreto returned to Universitario in July 2019. He signed a two-year extension to his contract at Universitario in January 2021.

Honours

Club
Universitario
 Peruvian Primera División runner up: 2020

Academia Deportiva Cantolao
 Peruvian Segunda División: 2016

References

External links
 

1995 births
Living people
Peruvian footballers
Footballers from Lima
Association football midfielders
Club Universitario de Deportes footballers
Academia Deportiva Cantolao players
Peruvian Primera División players